HMS Clio can refer to any of three Royal Navy ships named after the Greek muse of history:

  was a  launched in 1807 and broken up in 1845.
  was a wooden screw corvette launched in 1858 and sold in 1920.
  was a  sloop launched in 1903 and sold in 1920.

References

Royal Navy ship names